Lino Nessi (1904–??) was a Paraguayan football forward who played for Paraguay in the 1930 FIFA World Cup. He also played for Club Libertad.

References

External links
FIFA profile

1904 births
Paraguayan footballers
Paraguay international footballers
Association football forwards
Club Libertad footballers
1930 FIFA World Cup players
Year of death missing